Tommy Elias Bryan (born May 16, 1956) is an associate justice of the Alabama Supreme Court, who was first elected in 2012 and re-elected in 2018.  He was previously elected to the Alabama Court of Civil Appeals in 2004 and 2010.

Education

Bryan graduated from Brantley High School in 1974. He received a Bachelor of Science and Master of Science in Education from Troy University. He graduated with a Juris Doctor from Jones School of Law in 1983.

Legal and judicial career 

In 1987 Bryan became an assistant attorney general in Alabama. His position was in the Alabama environmental department. In 2005, he was sworn in for his seat as Judge on the Alabama Court of Civil Appeals. In 2010 was reelected for the same seat on the Alabama Court of Civil Appeals. In 2012 he was elected to the Alabama Supreme Court.

Personal life 

Bryan was raised by his parents Elias Daniel Bryan and Margie Spivey Bryanon the family farm in Crenshaw County, Alabama.

References

External links

1956 births
Living people
20th-century American lawyers
21st-century American judges
21st-century American lawyers
Alabama lawyers
Alabama Republicans
People from Crenshaw County, Alabama
Justices of the Supreme Court of Alabama
Thomas Goode Jones School of Law alumni
Troy University alumni